Ken Boyd may refer to:

 Ken Boyd (basketball) (born 1952), American basketball player
 Ken Boyd (footballer) (born 1938), Australian rules football player
 Ken Boyd (politician) (born 1947), Virginia politician
Kenneth Boyd, founder of thinktank Boyd Group